Loser is a 2000 American teen romantic comedy film written and directed by Amy Heckerling. Starring Jason Biggs, Mena Suvari and Greg Kinnear, it is about a fish-out-of-water college student (Biggs) who falls for a classmate (Suvari), unaware she is in a relationship with their English professor (Kinnear). The film, Heckerling's first after 1995's Clueless and a remake of the 1960 film The Apartment, was a box-office failure and received negative reviews.

Plot
Paul Tannek, a small-town, intelligent kid from the Midwest, is accepted into New York University on an academic scholarship. Following the advice of his father, he tries to gain friends by being polite and interested in others. However, Paul’s new roommates—Chris, Adam, and Noah, three rich, spoiled, obnoxious city boys—brand Paul a loser because they resent Paul’s polite behavior, working class background, and determination for an education. After Paul is thrown out of the dorm when the trio concocts a false story to the housing administration about Paul’s attitude, Paul is forced to take up residence in a veterinary hospital. Banned from throwing parties in the dorm because of an alcohol poisoning incident, Chris manipulates Paul into letting him, Adam, and Noah use the hospital to throw parties.

Paul meets classmate Dora Diamond and develops an attraction to her, unaware that she is having an affair with their decorated but highly pretentious English professor Edward Alcott. Dora is equally as intelligent as Paul, but doesn't have a scholarship and works shifts as a waitress in a strip club to pay for her tuition until she is unceremoniously fired. To avoid a long daily commute which she can no longer afford, Dora asks Alcott if she can temporarily live with him. Alcott selfishly declines her request for fear of losing his tenure at the university if his relationship with Dora is found out. After Paul and Dora bump into each other one night, Paul invites Dora to an Everclear concert when he learns she is a fan. Dora agrees to the date, but first goes to a job interview for a night shift in a convenience store, a position she is ultimately denied because she is a woman. Adam happens to be at the same store buying beer and invites Dora to a party which she accepts, but says she will be there only for a short time so she can meet Paul at the concert. At the party, one of the boys slips a roofie into Dora's drink, causing her to pass out. Paul returns home dejected from the concert to a huge mess and an unresponsive Dora and immediately rushes her to the hospital. At the hospital, Paul pretends to be her boyfriend since neither he nor Dora can afford to keep her there overnight. He also learns that Dora listed Alcott as her case of emergency contact which he tells Chris the next morning without thinking. Alcott tells emergency officials he doesn't really know Dora when they contact him.

Paul bonds with Dora as she recovers and they start to develop feelings for one another; he also learns that Dora cannot see past her blind infatuation with Alcott, as she tells Paul that Alcott loves her but does not want a relationship. While Paul continues with his studies, Dora searches for a new job. She pulls Paul out of class and invites him out to celebrate receiving a spot in a medical experiment. They steal a loaf of bread from a bakery, coffee from a dispenser in the park, and sneak into a Broadway show. Paul goes out to grab a pizza and a movie for both of them hoping it may lead to something further between them only to return to find Alcott, who has changed his mind about Dora living with him. Alcott reveals to Dora that Chris, Noah, and Adam are now blackmailing him with the knowledge of their relationship in return for passing grades, and also tells her he believes Paul is in on the scheme. After discovering roofies were involved at the party, Paul steals Noah's supply and replaces them with placebos. Paul then pays a visit to Alcott's office to ask how Dora is doing and is instead given his final exam as a take-home test by Alcott to buy his silence. Paul takes the moral high ground and refuses the test, jeopardizing his scholarship and place in the university.

Dora overhears Paul on the phone with his father talking about how much he misses her. Alcott then admits he learned that Paul had nothing to do with the blackmail, but still intends to fail him. Dora then realizes that Paul is the one who really loves her and terminates her affair with Alcott, beginning a relationship with Paul. Afterward, Adam, Noah, and Chris' behavior get the better of them and their lives plummet into failure, while Alcott is found out and sent to prison for having an affair with a different student who is underage, and Paul and Dora remain happy in their relationship.

Cast

Music
The music was composed by David Kitay.  No official soundtrack was ever released. These are the songs contained in the film:

Loser soundtrack

Track listing 

Michael Penn's song "No Myth", featured prominently in the final scene and during the credits, was not included in the soundtrack.

Reception

Box office 
The film opened at number eight at the North American box office, making $6,008,611 in its opening weekend. The film generated a total of $15.6 million in the US. It failed further when released worldwide, grossing a total of just $2.7 million. The film did not break even on its production costs.

In a 2017 interview with The Ringer, director Amy Heckerling said the reason for the film’s failure was the studio’s insistence on a “watered down” PG-13 rating, even though Heckerling and the studio executives who greenlit the film intended for the movie to be an R-rated comedy.

Critical response 
 
On Rotten Tomatoes, the film has a score of 24% based on reviews from 96 critics, with an average rating of 4.2/10. The site's consensus states: "In the grand tradition of teen flicks, Loser comes across as another predictable and underwritten movie with nothing new to offer." On Metacritic, it has a 35% score based on reviews from 29 critics, indicating "generally unfavorable reviews".

Roger Ebert gives the film two stars out of four. He enjoyed the performance of Kinnear as well as the chemistry between the two leads, but found the film otherwise unremarkable.

Film critic James Berardinelli gave the film 3 out 4 stars, stating that the film was one of the "pleasant surprises" of the 2000 film season.

References

External links
 
 

2000 films
2000 romantic comedy films
2000s teen comedy films
American independent films
American teen comedy films
Columbia Pictures films
Films directed by Amy Heckerling
Films scored by David Kitay
Films set in New York City
Films shot in Toronto
Films shot in New York City
Films with screenplays by Amy Heckerling
Films set in universities and colleges
Films about scandalous teacher–student relationships
2000s English-language films
2000s American films